Mark Hopkins may refer to:
Mark Hopkins (educator) (1802–1887), American educator
Mark N. Hopkins, filmmaker
Mark Hopkins Jr. (1813–1878), American railroad magnate
Mark Hopkins Hotel, a luxury hotel in the Nob Hill district of San Francisco, California

Hopkins, Mark